Radio SRF 4 News is the fourth radio station from Schweizer Radio und Fernsehen (SRF). The station was launched on 5 November 2007 (as DRS 4 News).

Programming
The stations programming includes: national and international news, politics, economy, stock market, sport, culture, science, information technology, media and training.

External links

2007 establishments in Switzerland
Radio stations established in 2007
German-language radio stations in Switzerland